Christison is a surname. Notable people with the surname include:

Alexander Christison, (1751–1820), Scottish educator and mathematician
Dan Christison (born 1972), an American mixed martial artist
David Christison, (1830–1912), Scottish physician, botanist, writer and antiquary
Kathleen Christison (born 1941), an American political analyst and author
Philip Christison GBE CB DSO MC (1893–1993), a British military commander of the Second World War
Robert Christison FRSE FRCSE FRCPE (1797–1882), a Scottish toxicologist and physician, president of the Royal College of Surgeons of Edinburgh
Robert Christison (pastoralist) (1837–1915), a pastoralist in Australia
Sir Alexander Christison (1828 – 1918), Scottish army surgeon
Wenlock Christison, last Quaker to be sentenced to death in Massachusetts
William Christison (c.1520–1603), Church of Scotland minister

See also
Christison baronets, a title in the Baronetage of the United Kingdom